Triuncina brunnea is a moth in the family Bombycidae first described by Alfred Ernest Wileman in 1911. It is found in Taiwan.

The wingspan is 26–28 mm.

References

Moths described in 1911
Bombycidae
Moths of Taiwan